, formerly known as , is a stable of sumo wrestlers, part of the Isegahama ichimon or group of stables. As of January 2023, it has seven wrestlers. 

The current version of the stable was established in January 1961 by former komusubi Tomoegata. Upon reaching the age of 65 in 1976 he turned the stable over to the former jūryō wrestler Yamatonishiki. In 1989 former sekiwake Kaiki became the stablemaster upon Yamatonishiki's retirement, and eventually produced ōzeki Kaiō. 

In April 2012, the stable absorbed seven wrestlers from a previous incarnation of the Ōshima stable, due to Ōshima-oyakata reaching the mandatory retirement age of 65. Among the wrestlers who transferred was former sekiwake Kyokutenhō, who one month later won his first yūshō (or tournament) for his new stable. In February 2014, former ōzeki Kaiō branched off and formed Asakayama stable, taking two wrestlers from Tomozuna with him. In June 2017, Kyokutenhō became the 11th Tomozuna's owner, and the first Mongolian born wrestler to take charge of a stable. He had retired two years earlier and inherited the Ōshima name, but rather than immediately re-establish Ōshima stable, he chose to initially keep the Tomozuna name by swapping elder names with the previous head coach (Kaiki) upon the latter reaching 65 years of age.

On 1 February 2022, Tomozuna stable was renamed Ōshima stable following another swap of elder names between Kyokutenhō and Kaiki. Following the demotion and subsequent retirement of Kaisei the stable has no sekitori as of September 2022.

On 7 February 2023, Ōshima stable, along with Kokonoe stable and Futagoyama stable, signed a partnership and cooperation agreement with the Katsushika Ward of Tokyo. The agreement was presented as having the objective of cooperating further in a wide range of areas, including tourism, culture, sports, and educational promotion, and work closely to revitalize local communities.

Ring name conventions
Many wrestlers at this stable have taken ring names or shikona that begin with the character 魁 (read: kai), in deference to their former head coach Kaiki. Examples Kaiō, Kaidō, Kainishiki and Kainowaka. Since absorbing the old Ōshima stable, they have also inherited wrestlers who use the character 旭 (read: asahi or kyoku), taken from Ōshima's former head coach Asahikuni.

Owners
2017–present: 11th Tomozuna (shunin, former sekiwake Kyokutenhō, known as Ōshima from February 2022)
1989–2017: 10th Tomozuna (former sekiwake Kaiki)
1976–1989: 9th Tomozuna: (former jūryō Yamatonishiki)
1941–1976: 14th Tamagaki, 1st Ajigawa, 9th Takashima, 8th Tomozuna (former komusubi Tomoegata）

Notable active wrestlers

Kyokutaisei (best rank maegashira)

Coaches
Tamagaki (iin, former komusubi Tomonohana)
Kiriyama (iin, former maegashira 11 Asahishō)
Tomozuna (toshiyori, former sekiwake Kaisei)

Notable other former members
Tachiyama (the 22nd yokozuna)
Kaiō (former ōzeki)
Sentoryū (former maegashira)
Kyokushūhō (former maegashira)
Kaidō (former jūryō)
37th Kimura Shōnosuke (given name  Saburō Hatakeyama - former chief referee)

Referee
Kimura Hisanosuke (makuuchi gyoji, real name Toshikazu Hata)
Shikimori Tomokazu (makushita gyōji, real name Hiromasa Shinya)
Kimura Katsunosuke (jonidan gyoji, real name Kaito Matsumoto)

Ushers
Kōkichi (makuuchi yobidashi, real name Katsushi Chiba)
Akira (makuuchi yobidashi, real name Toshiyuki Ichikawa)

Hairdresser
Tokoyuki (1st class tokoyama)

Location and access
Tokyo, Sumida ward, Narihira 3-1-9
7 minute walk from Oshiage Station on the Hanzōmon Line and Asakusa Line

See also
List of sumo stables
List of active sumo wrestlers
List of past sumo wrestlers
Glossary of sumo terms

References

External links
Official site
Japan Sumo Association profile

Active sumo stables